WRKL (910 AM Radio Abundancia Divina), is a radio station licensed to New City, New York, broadcasting a Spanish language Christian radio format.

By day, WRKL is powered at 1,000 watts, at night it reduces power to 800 watts, to protect other stations on 910 AM from interference.

History
WRKL first went on the air on July 4, 1964.  It featured a format of adult contemporary music with local news and information.  WRKL evolved into a news - talk format in the mid-1990s. The $1.6 million sale of WRKL to Polnet was consummated on March 19, 1999. On March 18, 1999, at 3:00 PM, the station signed off, concluding its English language programming. Polish language programming began the next day.

The station fell silent on February 18, 2017, several days after the collapse of one of its daytime towers on February 13. The station returned to the air on Wednesday February 22, 2017. On March 9, 2017, an application was filed with the Federal Communications Commission for an Engineering Special Temporary Authority to allow operation of WRKL at 25% power (250 Watts day, 200 Watts night, both non-directional) while repairs were made. The STA was granted on March 13, 2017, and expired on September 9, 2017.

On October 31, 2017, Polnet filed an application with the commission for reinstatement "nunc pro tunc" and extension of its Engineering STA, noting the inadvertent failure to file a timely renewal prior to the September 9 expiration. In its approval, the Commission granted a six-month extension of the STA, allowing WRKL to continue to operate at 25% power, non-directionally, until May 2, 2018, but specifically excluded the period from the expiration of the initial STA and the grant date of the extension.

On May 8, 2018, Polnet filed a request with the commission to further extend the STA, stating that the company was continuing to gather quotes to rebuild the destroyed tower. On June 1, 2018, the request was granted, extending the authority to operate non-directionally at 25% power until December 1, 2018. On December 11, 2018, Polnet filed for another extension of the STA, indicating they were working to secure funds to reconstruct the destroyed tower. That request was granted on December 18, 2018, extending the STA until June 17, 2019.

On June 6, 2019, Polnet again filed to extend the STA, citing financial hardship as the reason the repairs had not yet been made. The request was granted on July 3, 2019, extending the STA until January 3, 2020. Subsequent STA extensions were granted by the FCC on February 3, 2020; August 12, 2020; February 26, 2021; and September 8, 2021. Starting with the STA request in July 2020, Polnet's application included language that Polnet was ‘researching technical modifications that would permanently modify the facility’, and that the financial hardship was being exacerbated by COVID-19, language that has been repeated in all subsequent STA filings.

An October 11, 2021 online article reported that the entire 12.7 acre WRKL transmitter site, including the building housing the station's studios and offices, had been sold in May 2021. WRKL had been off the air since September 10, 2021, and on November 12, 2021, owner Polnet Communications filed a Notice of Suspension of Operations with the FCC. It stated that the signal had been silenced in October 2021 due to a misunderstanding with, and removal of some equipment by the "landowner". It also stated that Polnet "would be sending an engineer shortly to restore service." On November 29, 2021, Polnet filed a "Request for Silent STA" with the commission, saying that they would be working on "an agreement with the landlord that will allow it to reinstall all needed equipment to restore service." The application was granted on February 3, 2022. On February 24, 2022, the station filed for an STA to return to the air with reduced power of 200 Watts. The application stated that an agreement had been reached with the landowner that would allow WRKL to broadcast temporarily from its Pomona location. The STA was approved by the Commission on February 28, 2022, and is valid for 6 months. The following day, March 1, WRKL returned to the air, simulcasting the Spanish Christian programming of WNYG, Patchogue, New York.

WRKL's current license will expire on June 1, 2022. Polnet's renewal application for WRKL was filed on February 28, 2022, 27 days later than required by the commission's February 1 deadline.

References

External links 
WRKL Station records at the University of Maryland Libraries
Polskie Radio WRKL & WLIM
WRKL Online Public Inspection File

RKL
RKL
Radio stations established in 1964
1964 establishments in New York (state)